Anand Bais (born 18 July 1991) is an Indian first-class cricketer who plays for Madhya Pradesh.

References

External links
 

1991 births
Living people
Indian cricketers
Madhya Pradesh cricketers
People from Balaghat